Loch Loyal is a freshwater Scottish loch, located near Lairg in Sutherland, in the northern Highlands.

The Loch flows north through Loch Craggie and Loch Slaim into the River Borgie. Loch Loyal is surrounded by mountain ranges that include Beinn Stumanadh, Ben Hiel, and Cnoc nan Cuilean. The town of Tongue is close to Loch Loyal. In 2002 Loch Loyal had a population of one thousand greylag geese and provides nesting sites for rare black-throated divers.

References

Press and Journal - Article - Unexpected pleasures abound on Loch Loyal
Atlas of the World. New York. Oxford University Press. 2002. Print.
Loch Loyal, Scotland. Google Maps. 10, May 2012. Web.

Loyal
Loyal
Landforms of Sutherland